Neil Michael Knight Smith (born 27 July 1967) is a former English cricketer who played in seven One Day Internationals from 1986 to 1996. He then went on to work at Warwick School for boys, Myton Road, Warwick as the Groundsman but has recently semi retired. He is the son of the former England Test captain, M J K Smith.

Smith was part of a successful Warwickshire side which won the County Championship under the captaincy 
of Dermot Reeve in successive seasons in 1994 and 1995. Smith was 
particularly valuable in one-day cricket, and helped Warwickshire to win the NatWest Trophy in 1989, hitting Simon Hughes for a six in a tense last-over climax in the final. Warwickshire and Smith also won the NatWest Trophy in 1993 and 1995, the Benson and Hedges Cup in 1995, and the Sunday League in 1994 and 1997, the latter when Smith was captain (following his father as Warwickshire captain) and top run-scorer.

The highlight of his brief international career comprised his mixed experiences during a match against the United Arab Emirates during the 1996 Cricket World Cup. He won the man of the match award in this fixture, one of only two that England won in a miserable world cup campaign, although he was also forced to retire ill after vomiting while batting. He also opened the batting in the following fixture against the Netherlands and made his highest one-day international score of 31, but his international career ended a few months later.

References

1967 births
Living people
England One Day International cricketers
English cricketers
Warwickshire cricketers
Warwickshire cricket captains
Shropshire cricketers